The Labbu Myth, “The Slaying of Labbu”, or possibly: the Kalbu Myth – depending on the reading of the first character in the antagonist's name (which is always written as KAL and may be read as: Lab, Kal, Rib or Tan); is an ancient Mesopotamian creation epic with its origin no later than the Old Babylonian period. It is a folktale possibly of the Diyala region, since the later version seems to feature the god Tišpak as its protagonist and may be an allegory representing his replacement of the chthonic serpent-god Ninazu at the top of the pantheon of the city of Eshnunna. This part is played by Nergal in the earlier version. It was possibly a precursor of the Enûma Eliš, where Labbu – meaning "Raging One" or "lion", was the prototype of Tiamat and of the Canaanite tale of Baal fighting Yamm.

Synopsis

Extant in two very fragmentary copies; an Old Babylonian one and a later Assyrian from the Library of Ashurbanipal, which have no complete surviving lines – the Labbu Myth relates the tale of a possibly leonine but certainly serpentine monster: a fifty-league long Bašmu (mušba-aš-ma) or sixty-league long Mušḫuššu (MUŠ-ḪUŠ), depending on the version and reconstruction of the text.  The opening of the Old Babylonian version recalls that of The Epic of Gilgamesh:
The cities sigh, the people... The people decreased in number,... For their lamentation there was none to...

The vast dimensions of Labbu are described. The sea (tāmtu) has given birth to the dragon (line 6). The fragmentary line: "He raises his tail..." identifies him according to Neil Forsyth as a precursor of a later adversary; the dragon of Revelation 12:4, whose tail swept a third of the stars of heaven, and cast them down to earth.

In the later version, Labbu is created by the god Enlil who "drew [a picture of] the dragon in the sky" to wipe out humanity whose raucous noise has been disturbing his sleep, a recurring motif in Babylonian creation epics. Whether this refers to the Milky Way (Heidel 1963) or a comet (Forsyth 1989) is not clear. The gods are terrified by the apparition of this monstrous creature and appeal to the moon god Sin or the goddess Aruru who addresses Tišpak/Nergal to counter the threat and "exercise kingship", presumably over Eshnunna, as a reward. Tišpak/Nergal raises objections to tangling with the serpent but – after a gap in the narrative, a god whose name is not preserved provides guidance on military strategy. A storm erupts and the victor, who may or may not be Tišpak or Nergal, in accordance with the advice given, fires an arrow to slay the beast.

The fragments of the epic are not part of a cosmogony as noted by Forsyth; since the cities of men are already in existence when the narrative takes place. Frans Wiggerman interpreted the myth's function as a way of justifying Tishpak's ascension to status of king, "as a consequence of his 'liberation' of the nation, sanctioned by the decision of a divine council."

Principal publications

  plates 34-35 of tablet Rm 282 (line art)
  plate 6 of tablet VAT 9443 (line art)
  (translation)
  (translation)
  (translation)
  (translation)
  (transliteration and translation)
  (translation)

References
 

Akkadian literature
Mesopotamian legendary creatures
Mythological aquatic creatures
Dragons